Zabrus apfelbecki is a species of ground beetle in the Pelor subgenus that is endemic to Bosnia and Herzegovina.

References

Beetles described in 1915
Beetles of Europe
Endemic fauna of Bosnia and Herzegovina